Athletes from the Kingdom of Serbs, Croats and Slovenes competed at the 1924 Summer Olympics in Paris, France. For the first time in history the country won medals.

Medalists

Athletics

Five athletes represented Yugoslavia in 1924. It was the nation's debut appearance in the sport.

Ranks given are within the heat.

Cycling

Four cyclists represented Yugoslavia in 1924. It was the nation's debut in the sport.

Road cycling
Men

Equestrian

A single equestrian represented Yugoslavia in 1924. It was the nation's debut in the sport. Seunig finished last in the dressage event.

Football

Yugoslavia competed in the Olympic football tournament for the second time in 1924.

 Team Roster
Dragutin Vrđuka
Stjepan Vrbančić
Eugen Dasović
Marijan Marjanović
Rudolf Rupec
Janko Rodin
Dragutin Babić
Dušan Petković
Emil Perška
Vladimir Vinek
Emil Plazzeriano

 Round 1

Final rank 17th

Gymnastics

Eight gymnasts represented Yugoslavia in 1924. It was the nation's debut in the sport. Leon Štukelj took the gold medal in the horizontal bar to become Yugoslavia's first Olympic medalist (and first champion) in any sport; he would go on to finish first overall and take the all-around gold medal.

Artistic

Swimming

Ranks given are within the heat.

 Men

Tennis

 Men

Wrestling

Greco-Roman

 Men's

References
Official Olympic Reports
International Olympic Committee results database

Nations at the 1924 Summer Olympics
1924
Summer Olympics